Sergeant Daniel Tweed Ferrier (November 26, 1841 to March 18, 1914) was an American soldier who fought in the American Civil War. Ferrier received the country's highest award for bravery during combat, the Medal of Honor, for his action at Varnells Station in Georgia on 9 May 1864. He was honored with the award on 30 March 1898.

Biography
Ferrier was born in Indiana on 26 November 1841. He enlisted into the 2nd Indiana Cavalry. He died on 18 March 1914 and his remains are interred at the Nebo Cemetery in Camden, Indiana.

Medal of Honor citation

See also

List of American Civil War Medal of Honor recipients: A–F

References

1841 births
1914 deaths
People of Indiana in the American Civil War
Union Army officers
United States Army Medal of Honor recipients
American Civil War recipients of the Medal of Honor